Seth Margolis is an American author of fiction who has written five books over the past two decades. In 1995, one of his books was made into a feature film called Losing Isaiah, starring Jessica Lange and Halle Berry. In 2006 he released Closing Costs, a story about the New York City real estate market. He has also written a number of New York Times articles about travel and entertainment.

Bibliography
President's Day (2017)
Semper Sonnet (2016)
Closing Cost (2015)
False Faces (2015)
Vanishing Act (2015)

References

External links
 Official website
 

20th-century American novelists
21st-century American novelists
American male novelists
Living people
20th-century American male writers
21st-century American male writers
20th-century American non-fiction writers
21st-century American non-fiction writers
American male non-fiction writers
Year of birth missing (living people)